Dry Creek is a tributary,  long, of Crooked Creek in the U.S. state of Oregon. The creek, which is intermittent, begins in the desert near Five Points in Malheur County.

Forming northeast of Five Points, Dry Creek flows north, then west, across Squaw Flat in southern Malheur County near the border with the U.S. state of Nevada. Near Garlow Butte, Coyote Creek enters from the left, and near Caviatta Ridge, Peacock Creek enters from the left. West of Caviatta Ridge, the creek turns north and receives Corbin Creek from the right. Dry Creek flows through Blevins Reservoir and then Rockhouse Reservoir before turning west again and receiving Indian Fort Creek from the right. Turning north, it joins Crooked Creek just south of U.S. Route 95 about halfway between Burns Junction and Rome.

See also
List of rivers of Oregon
List of longest streams of Oregon

References

Rivers of Oregon
Rivers of Malheur County, Oregon